Discopteromyia is a genus of flies in the family Stratiomyidae.

Species
Discopteromyia bicincta Meijere, 1913
Discopteromyia fascipennis James, 1978
Discopteromyia inermis James, 1978

References

Stratiomyidae
Brachycera genera
Taxa named by Johannes C. H. de Meijere
Diptera of Asia
Diptera of Australasia